Jean Charles or Giancarlo Pallavicini (14 April 1911, Desio, Italy – 22 September 1999, Desio, Italy) was a member of the Sovereign Military Order of Malta, serving as its Lieutenant during 1988 in the interim between the Grand Masterships of Angelo de Mojana di Cologna and Andrew Bertie.

Pallavicini was admitted as a Knight of Honour and Obedience 13 May 1953. On 22 June 1963 he was promoted to the rank of Knight of Obedience (later altered to Knight of Honour and Devotion in Obedience).

Notes

1911 births
1999 deaths
People from Desio
Lieutenants of the Sovereign Military Order of Malta